Huddersfield Town's 1989–90 campaign was a fairly successful season, with the exception of Town's failure of reaching the play-offs, after they finished in 8th place, just 2 places and 4 points off the play-offs.

Squad at the start of the season

Review
Following a disappointing first season back in the 3rd Division, many were wondering if Town were going to mount any serious promotion challenge, and if Craig Maskell was going to carry on his goalscoring form from the previous season. Town did start the season brightly and only lost two of their first 13 league games.

The middle part of the season saw Town carry on their good start to the season and during the Christmas/New Year season, they won 6 out of 8 and by February, Town reached 5th place, with a play-off place at least seeming to be the minimum requirement for Town's season. However, from February onwards, Town's promotion dreams took a major downward spiral into nothingness.

Amongst the interesting records set by Town during the end of the season were the unwanted record of losing 5 consecutive home league games set between 3 March and 3 April. Also, Bury beat Town 6–0 at Gigg Lane in April, 12 months after Town beat them 6–0 at Gigg Lane. On a brighter note, Craig Maskell became only the third Town player to score 4 goals in an away match in Town's 5–1 win at Cardiff City, equalling the feat set by Charlie Wilson and George Brown. (That record would later be broken by Jordan Rhodes' 5 goals in Town's 6–0 win at Wycombe Wanderers in the 2011–12 season.)

Squad at the end of the season

Results

Division Three

FA Cup

League Cup

League Trophy

Appearances and goals

1989–90
Huddersfield Town